Alina Dumitru (born 30 August 1982) is a Romanian judoka, one-time Olympic champion and eight-time European champion. At the 2008 Summer Olympics she defeated Japanese double gold medallist Ryoko Tani, who until then had been undefeated in major international competitions for 12 years.

Career

2008 Summer Olympics
Dumitru defeated the legendary five-time Olympian Ryoko Tani by "keikoku" in a shocking –48 kg semifinal upset at the Beijing Science and Technology University Gymnasium. She controlled the five-minute showdown, maintaining her position with strong defense, refusing to budge or give her experienced foe a chance to mount a strong attack. It worked, as Tani lost points for passivity. Then she flipped Cuba's Yanet Bermoy becoming the first Romanian judoka to win a gold medal in the Summer Olympic Games.

2012 Summer Olympics
She took part in the Judo at the 2012 Summer Olympics but lost in the final against Sarah Menezes. In the semifinals, Dumitru beat world number one Tomoko Fukumi.

Awards
Alina Dumitru was decorated by the president of Romania, Traian Băsescu, with Medalia "Meritul Sportiv" — (The Medal "The Sportive Merit") class III.

She was given the award of Cetățean de onoare ("Honorary Citizen") of her hometown Ploiești in 2008.

References

External links
 
 
 
 
 
 Videos of Alina Alexandra Dumitru (judovision.org)

1982 births
Living people
Sportspeople from Bucharest
Romanian female judoka
Judoka at the 2004 Summer Olympics
Judoka at the 2008 Summer Olympics
Judoka at the 2012 Summer Olympics
Olympic judoka of Romania
Olympic gold medalists for Romania
Olympic medalists in judo
Olympic silver medalists for Romania
Medalists at the 2012 Summer Olympics
Medalists at the 2008 Summer Olympics
20th-century Romanian women
21st-century Romanian women